David Paul Gregg (March 11, 1923 – November 8, 2001) was an American engineer. He was the inventor of the optical disc (disk). Gregg was inspired to create the optical disc in 1958 while working at California electronics company, Westrex, a part of Western Electric. His patent for a "Videodisk" was filed in March 1962 (USPO 3350503) while working to advance electron beam recording and reproducing.

Gregg went to work at 3M's Mincom division with experienced television videotape engineers Wayne Johnson and Dean De Moss. The three men subsequently filed patents to cover a disc-recording system, a way to duplicate discs, and reproducing TV signals from photographic discs. When Mincom contracted Stanford's SRI to further the research, Gregg left and formed his own company, Gauss Electrophysics.

In 1968 the Gregg and Gauss patents were purchased by MCA (Music Corporation of America), which helped develop the technology further. His designs and patents paved the way for the LaserDisc, which helped with the creation of the DVD, compact discs, and MiniDisc. In 1963 he also invented a video disk camera which could store several minutes' worth of images onto an optical video disk. There was no patent files for the camera and only little is known about it. Gregg died in Culver City, California in November 2001 at the age of 78.

When Gregg had improvised his invention, he imagined himself as a consumer. He interpreted that the LaserDisc (also known as the optical disc), "had to be of extremely low-cost, which implied the utmost simplicity, lowest material and processing costs, and user friendliness."

See also
James Russell (inventor)
Optical recording

References

External links
About.com article about David Gregg
Entry in Smart Computing encyclopedia (via Internet Archive Wayback Machine)
Gregg, D. P. (1997). Patents and inventorship issues over the last thirty years of optical storage.
Another article.

1923 births
2001 deaths
20th-century American engineers
20th-century American inventors